Tom Savage (born November 28, 1953) is a contemporary American painter based in California whose work appears in museum collections and has been exhibited in major cities throughout the United States. His abstract paintings and drawings take a historical cue from post-war European automatism and surrealism, and the influence those movements had on abstract expressionism.

Critical debate
The primal, unconscious and disharmonious nature of Savage's technique, which the artist himself has described as the antithesis of that of regionalist painter Thomas Hart Benton, has proven an interpretive challenge for critics.

In his Los Angeles Times review of Savage's 1995 solo exhibition at the Cirrus Gallery in Los Angeles, critic David Pagel described the artist's works as "raw, incoherent, precarious and daring. At the same time, they're confident and desperate, riddled with deep doubts but also profoundly self-assured."

Writing of the same show in the national West Coast contemporary art review Artweek, critic Peter Kosenko characterized Savage's paintings as "abstract and generally impressionistic, but they nonetheless resist placement within the traditions of abstract expressionism as codified by formalist criticism, for they display little of the angst-ridden struggle with paint or the preoccupation with the sublime that often characterize the strategies of the genre."

Critic David DiMichele of the Los Angeles Downtown News, noting Savage's use of unprimed canvas and "thinly applied traceries," wrote that the artist's style is "marked by a pronounced sense of restraint.... Emphatically abstract, his work seeks to preserve something of the initial excitement that occurs when an artist first puts brush to canvas."

Revisiting Savage's work at the August 1996 exhibition Transcendental Meditations at the William Turner Gallery in Venice, California, Los Angeles Times critic David Pagel observed that the artist's "inarticulate markings, crudely painted and scrawled on raw canvas, share more with children's drawings than with any desire to leave this world behind."

List of major works
 On Top of the World (2004; oil, acrylic and charcoal; 84" × 72")
 Someone Should Say Something (2003; oil and acrylic; 64¼" × 54⅛")
 Untitled (2003; mixed media; 120" × 96")
 Rusted Cage (2000; mixed media; 64" × 54")

Museum collections
Tom Savage's work is in the following institutional collections:

 Arizona State University Art Museum, Tempe, Arizona
 De Saisset Museum, Santa Clara University, Santa Clara, California
 Los Angeles County Museum of Art, Los Angeles, California
 Tucson Museum of Art, Tucson, Arizona

Selected exhibitions
Savage's solo exhibitions include:

 2001: Is Was, Post Gallery, Los Angeles, California
 2000: Recent Works, Post Gallery, Los Angeles, California
 1997: Ruth Bachofner Gallery, Santa Monica, California
 1996: 410 Boyd Street, Los Angeles, California
 1996: Idyllwild Arts Academy, Idyllwild, California
 1995: Connecticut College, Joann Toor Cummings Gallery, New London, Connecticut
 1995: Recent Paintings, Cirrus Gallery, Los Angeles, California
 1992: University of Montana, Missoula, Montana
 1991: Shoshana Wayne Gallery, Santa Monica, California
 1989: Dinnerware Gallery, Tucson, Arizona
 1988: Concourse Gallery, Bank of America World Headquarters, San Francisco, California

References

External links
Official website
  (2008 documentary short film)

1953 births
American illustrators
20th-century American painters
American male painters
21st-century American painters
Abstract expressionist artists
Living people
20th-century American male artists